WhatsApp (also called WhatsApp Messenger) is an internationally available freeware, cross-platform, centralized instant messaging (IM) and voice-over-IP (VoIP) service owned by US tech conglomerate Meta. It allows users to send text and voice messages, make voice and video calls, and share images, documents, user locations, and other content. WhatsApp's client application runs on mobile devices, and can be accessed from computers. The service requires a cellular mobile telephone number to sign up. In January 2018, WhatsApp released a standalone business app called WhatsApp Business which can communicate with the standard WhatsApp client.

The service was created by WhatsApp Inc. of Mountain View, California, which was acquired by Facebook in February 2014 for approximately US$19.3 billion. It became the world's most popular messaging application by 2015, and had more than 2billion users worldwide by February 2020. By 2016, it had become the primary means of Internet communication in regions including Latin America, the Indian subcontinent, and large parts of Europe and Africa.

History

2009–2014 
WhatsApp was founded in February 2009 by Brian Acton and Jan Koum, former employees of Yahoo!. In January 2009, after Koum purchased an iPhone, he and Acton decided to create an app for the App Store. The idea started off as an app that would display statuses in a phone's Contacts menu - showing if a person was at work or on a call. 

Their discussions often took place at the home of Koum's Russian friend Alex Fishman in West San Jose. They realized that to take the idea further, they would need an iPhone developer. Fishman visited RentACoder.com, found Russian developer Igor Solomennikov, and introduced him to Koum.

Koum named the app WhatsApp to sound like "what's up". On February 24, 2009, he incorporated WhatsApp Inc. in California. However, when early versions of WhatsApp kept crashing, Koum considered giving up and looking for a new job. Acton encouraged him to wait for a "few more months".

In June 2009, when the app had been downloaded by only a handful of Fishman's Russian-speaking friends, Apple launched push notifications, allowing users to be pinged even when not using the app.

Koum updated WhatsApp so that everyone in the user's network would be notified when a user's status changed. This new facility, to Koum's surprise, was used by users to ping "each other with jokey custom statuses like, "I woke up late" or "I'm on my way."

Fishman said "At some point it sort of became instant messaging".

WhatsApp 2.0 was released in August 2009 with a purpose-designed messaging component; the number of active users suddenly increased to 250,000.

Although Acton was working on another startup idea, he decided to join the company. In October 2009, Acton persuaded five former friends at Yahoo! to invest $250,000 in seed funding, and Acton became a co-founder and was given a stake. He officially joined WhatsApp on November 1. After months at beta stage, the application launched in November 2009 on the App Store, exclusively for the iPhone. Koum then hired a friend in Los Angeles, Chris Peiffer, to develop a BlackBerry version, which arrived two months later. Subsequently, WhatsApp for Symbian OS was added in May 2010, and for Android OS in August 2010. In 2010 Google made multiple acquisition offers for WhatsApp, which were all declined.

To cover the cost of sending verification texts to users, WhatsApp was changed from a free service to a paid one. In December 2009, the ability to send photos was added to the iOS version. By early 2011, WhatsApp was one of the top 20 apps in the U.S. Apple App Store.

In April 2011, Sequoia Capital invested about $8 million for more than 15% of the company, after months of negotiation by Sequoia partner Jim Goetz.

By February 2013, WhatsApp had about 200 million active users and 50 staff members. Sequoia invested another $50 million, and WhatsApp was valued at $1.5 billion. Some time in 2013 WhatsApp acquired Santa Clara-based startup SkyMobius, the developers of Vtok, a video and voice calling app.

In a December 2013 blog post, WhatsApp claimed that 400 million active users used the service each month.
The year 2013 ended with $148 million in expenses, of which $138 million in losses.

2014–2015 
On February 19, 2014, one year after a venture capital financing round at a $1.5 billion valuation, Facebook, Inc. (now Meta Platforms) announced it was acquiring WhatsApp for US$19 billion, its largest acquisition to date. At the time, it was the largest acquisition of a venture-capital-backed company in history. Sequoia Capital received an approximate 5,000% return on its initial investment. Facebook, which was advised by Allen & Co, paid $4 billion in cash, $12 billion in Facebook shares, and, advised by Morgan Stanley, an additional $3 billion in restricted stock units granted to WhatsApp's founders Koum and Acton. Employee stock was scheduled to vest over four years subsequent to closing. Days after the announcement, WhatsApp users experienced a loss of service, leading to anger across social media.

The acquisition was influenced by the data provided by Onavo, Facebook's research app for monitoring competitors and trending usage of social activities on mobile phones, as well as startups that were performing "unusually well".

The acquisition caused many users to try, or move to, other message services. Telegram claimed that it acquired 8 million new users; and Line, 2 million.

At a keynote presentation at the Mobile World Congress in Barcelona in February 2014, Facebook CEO Mark Zuckerberg said that Facebook's acquisition of WhatsApp was closely related to the Internet.org vision. A TechCrunch article said about Zuckerberg's vision:The idea, he said, is to develop a group of basic internet services that would be free of charge to use – 'a 911 for the internet.' These could be a social networking service like Facebook, a messaging service, maybe search and other things like weather. Providing a bundle of these free of charge to users will work like a gateway drug of sorts – users who may be able to afford data services and phones these days just don't see the point of why they would pay for those data services. This would give them some context for why they are important, and that will lead them to pay for more services like this – or so the hope goes.

Three days after announcing the Facebook purchase, Koum said they were working to introduce voice calls. He also said that new mobile phones would be sold in Germany with the WhatsApp brand, and that their ultimate goal was to be on all smartphones.

In August 2014, WhatsApp was the most popular messaging app in the world, with more than 600 million users. By early January 2015, WhatsApp had 700 million monthly users and over 30 billion messages every day. In April 2015, Forbes predicted that between 2012 and 2018, the telecommunications industry would lose $386 billion because of "over-the-top" services like WhatsApp and Skype. That month, WhatsApp had over 800 million users. By September 2015, it had grown to 900 million; and by February 2016, one billion.

Voice calls between two accounts were added to the app in March and April 2015.

On November 30, 2015, the Android WhatsApp client made links to messaging service Telegram unclickable and uncopyable. Multiple sources confirmed that it was intentional, not a bug, and that it had been implemented when the Android source code that recognized Telegram URLs had been identified. (The word "telegram" appeared in WhatsApp's code.) Some considered it an anti-competitive measure; WhatsApp offered no explanation.

2016–2019 
On January 18, 2016, WhatsApp's co-founder Jan Koum announced that it would no longer charge users a $1 annual subscription fee, in an effort to remove a barrier faced by users without payment cards. He also said that the app would not display any third-party ads, and that it would have new features such as the ability to communicate with businesses.

By June 2016, the company's blog reported more than 100 million voice calls per day were being placed on WhatsApp.

On November 10, 2016, WhatsApp launched a beta version of two-factor authentication for Android users, which allowed them to use their email addresses for further protection. Also in November 2016, Facebook ceased collecting WhatsApp data for advertising in Europe. Later that month, video calls between two accounts were introduced.

On February 24, 2017, (WhatsApp's 8th birthday), WhatsApp launched a new Status feature similar to Snapchat and Facebook stories.

On May 18, 2017, the European Commission announced that it was fining Facebook €110 million for "providing misleading information about WhatsApp takeover" in 2014. The Commission said that in 2014 when Facebook acquired the messaging app, it "falsely claimed it was technically impossible to automatically combine user information from Facebook and WhatsApp." However, in the summer of 2016, WhatsApp had begun sharing user information with its parent company, allowing information such as phone numbers to be used for targeted Facebook advertisements. Facebook acknowledged the breach, but said the errors in their 2014 filings were "not intentional".

In September 2017, WhatsApp's co-founder Brian Acton left the company to start a nonprofit group, later revealed as the Signal Foundation, which developed the WhatsApp competitor Signal. He explained his reasons for leaving in an interview with Forbes a year later.  WhatsApp also announced a forthcoming business platform to enable companies to provide customer service at scale, and airlines KLM and Aeroméxico announced their participation in the testing. Both airlines had previously launched customer services on the Facebook Messenger platform.

In January 2018, WhatsApp launched WhatsApp Business for small business use.

In April 2018, WhatsApp co-founder and CEO Jan Koum announced he would be leaving the company. By leaving before November 2018, due to concerns about privacy, advertising, and monetization by Facebook, Acton and Koum gave up $1.3 billion in unvested stock options. Facebook later announced that Koum's replacement would be Chris Daniels.

Later in September 2018, WhatsApp introduced group audio and video call features. In October, the "Swipe to Reply" option was added to the Android beta version, 16 months after it was introduced for iOS.

On October 25, 2018, WhatsApp announced support for Stickers. But unlike other platforms WhatsApp requires third-party apps to add Stickers to WhatsApp.

On November 25, 2019, WhatsApp announced an investment of $250,000 through a partnership with Startup India to provide 500 startups with Facebook ad credits of $500 each.

In December 2019, WhatsApp announced that a new update would lock out any Apple users who hadn't updated to iOS 9 or higher and Samsung, Huawei, Sony and Google users who hadn't updated to version 4.0 by February 1, 2020. The company also reported that Windows Phone operating systems would no longer be supported after December 31, 2019. WhatsApp was announced to be the 3rd most downloaded mobile phone app of the decade 2010–2019.

Since 2020 
In early 2020, WhatsApp launched its "dark mode" for iPhone and Android devices – a new design consisting of a darker palette. In March, WhatsApp partnered with the World Health Organization and UNICEF to provide messaging hotlines for people to get information on the 2019–2020 coronavirus pandemic. In the same month WhatsApp began testing a feature to help users find out more information and context about information they receive to help combat misinformation.

In October 2020, WhatsApp rolled out a feature allowing users to mute both individuals and group chats forever. The mute options are ‘8 hours', '1 week', and ‘Always'. The 'Always' option replaced the '1 year' option that was originally part of the settings.

In January 2021, WhatsApp announced a new Privacy Policy allowing WhatsApp to share data with its parent company, Facebook; users who did not accept by February 8, 2021, would lose access to the app. This would not apply in the EU, since it violates the principles of GDPR. Facing criticism, WhatsApp postponed the update to May 15, 2021, but said they had no plans to limit functionality of or nag users who did not approve the new terms.

In March 2021, WhatsApp started rolling out support for third-party animated stickers, initially in Iran, Brazil and Indonesia, then worldwide.

In July 2021, WhatsApp announced forthcoming support for sending uncompressed images and videos in 3 options: Auto, Best Quality and Data Saver, and end-to-end encryption for backups stored in Facebook's cloud. The company was also testing multi-device support, allowing Computer users to run WhatsApp without an active phone session.

On October 4, 2021, Facebook had its worst outage since 2008, which  also affected other platforms owned by Facebook, such as Instagram and WhatsApp.

WhatsApp has the facility to hide users' online status ("Last Seen"). In December 2021, WhatsApp changed the default setting from "everyone" to only people in the user's contacts or who have been conversed with ("nobody" is also an option).

In April 2022, WhatsApp announced undated plans to roll out a Communities feature allowing several group chats to exist in a shared space, getting unified notifications and opening up smaller discussion groups. The company also announced plans to implement reactions, the ability for administrators to delete messages in groups and voice calls up to 32 participants.

In May 2022, the file upload limit was raised from 100 MB to 2 GB, and maximum group size increased to 512 members.

In August 2022, WhatsApp launched an integration with JioMart, available only to users in India. Local users can text special numbers in the app to launch an in-app shopping process, where they can order groceries.

Platform support 
After months at beta stage, the official first release of WhatsApp for iOS launched in November 2009. In January 2010, support for BlackBerry smartphones was added; and subsequently for Symbian OS in May 2010, and for Android OS in August 2010. In August 2011, a beta for Nokia's non-smartphone OS Series 40 was added. A month later, support for Windows Phone was added, followed by BlackBerry 10 in March 2013. In April 2015, support for Samsung's Tizen OS was added.
The oldest device capable of running WhatsApp was the Symbian-based Nokia N95 released in March 2007 ( WhatsApp is no longer compatible with it).

In August 2014, WhatsApp released an update, adding support for Android Wear smartwatches.

On January 21, 2015, WhatsApp launched WhatsApp Web, a browser-based web client that could be used by syncing with a mobile device's connection.

On February 26, 2016, WhatsApp announced they would cease support for BlackBerry (including BlackBerry 10), Nokia Series 40, and Symbian S60, as well as older versions of Android (2.2), Windows Phone (7.0), and iOS (6), by the end of 2016. BlackBerry, Nokia Series 40, and Symbian support was then extended to June 30, 2017. In June 2017, support for BlackBerry and Series 40 was once again extended until the end of 2017, while Symbian was dropped.

Support for BlackBerry and older (version 8.0) Windows Phone and older (version 6) iOS devices was dropped on January 1, 2018, but was extended to December 2018 for Nokia Series 40. In July 2018, it was announced that WhatsApp would soon be available for KaiOS feature phones.

In October 2019, WhatsApp officially launched a new fingerprint app-locking feature for Android users.

In August 2021, WhatsApp launched a feature that allows for chat history to be transferred between mobile operating systems. The feature launched only on the Samsung phones with plans to expand to Android and iOS in the future.

WhatsApp Web 
WhatsApp was officially made available for PCs through a web client, under the name WhatsApp Web, in late January 2015 through an announcement made by Koum on his Facebook page: "Our web client is simply an extension of your phone: the web browser mirrors conversations and messages from your mobile device—this means all of your messages still live on your phone". As of January 21, 2015, the desktop version was only available to Android, BlackBerry, and Windows Phone users. Later on, it also added support for iOS, Nokia Series 40, and Nokia S60 (Symbian).
Previously the WhatsApp user's handset had to be connected to the Internet for the browser application to function but as of an update in October 2021 that is no longer the case. All major desktop browsers are supported except for Internet Explorer. WhatsApp Web's user interface is based on the default Android one and can be accessed through web.whatsapp.com. Access is granted after the users scan their personal QR code through their mobile WhatsApp application.

There are similar solutions for macOS, such as the open-source ChitChat, previously known as WhatsMac.

In January 2021, the limited Android beta version allowed users to use WhatsApp Web without having to keep the mobile app connected to the Internet. In March 2021, this beta feature was extended to iOS users. However, linked devices (using WhatsApp Web, WhatsApp Desktop or Facebook Portal) will become disconnected if people don't use their phone for over 14 days. The multi-device beta can only show messages for the last 3 months on the web version, which was not the case without the beta because the web version was syncing with the phone.
Since April 2022, the multi-device beta is integrated by default in WhatsApp and users cannot check old messages on the web version anymore.

Microsoft Windows and Mac 
On May 10, 2016, the messaging service was introduced for both Microsoft Windows and macOS operating systems. Recently, WhatsApp added support for video calls and voice calls from their desktop clients. Similar to the WhatsApp Web format, the app, which will be synced with a user's mobile device, is available for download on the website. It supports OS versions of Windows 8 and OS X 10.10 and higher.

Apple iPad 
iPad users searching for WhatsApp are shown numerous third-party clients. Several top results have names and logos resembling WhatsApp itself, and some users do not realize they are using a third-party client. Per WhatsApp's policy, using third-party clients can result in the account getting permanently banned.

, WhatsApp does not have an official iPad client. In a 2022 interview with The Verge, WhatsApp chief Will Cathcart acknowledged that "[p]eople have wanted an iPad app for a long time" and said that the team would "love to do it."

Technical 
WhatsApp uses a customized version of the open standard Extensible Messaging and Presence Protocol (XMPP). Upon installation, it creates a user account using one's phone number as the username (Jabber ID: [phone number]@s.whatsapp.net).

WhatsApp software automatically compares all the phone numbers from the device's address book with its central database of WhatsApp users to automatically add contacts to the user's WhatsApp contact list. Previously the Android and Nokia Series 40 versions used an MD5-hashed, reversed-version of the phone's IMEI as password, while the iOS version used the phone's Wi-Fi MAC address instead of IMEI. A 2012 update now generates a random password on the server side.
Alternatively a user can send to any contact in WhatsApp database through the url https:// api.whatsapp.com/send/?phone=[phone number] where [phone number] is the number of the contact including the country code.

Some dual-SIM devices may not be compatible with WhatsApp, though non-official workarounds can be used to install the app.

In February 2015, WhatsApp introduced a voice calling feature; this helped WhatsApp to attract a completely different segment of the user population. WhatsApp's voice codec is Opus, which uses the modified discrete cosine transform (MDCT) and linear predictive coding (LPC) audio compression algorithms. WhatsApp uses Opus at 816 kHz sampling rates. On November 14, 2016, WhatsApp added a video calling feature for users across Android, iPhone, and Windows Phone devices.

In November 2017, WhatsApp released a new feature that would let its users delete messages sent by mistake within a time frame of 7 minutes.

Multimedia messages are sent by uploading the image, audio or video to be sent to an HTTP server and then sending a link to the content along with its Base64 encoded thumbnail (if applicable).

WhatsApp follows a "store and forward" mechanism for exchanging messages between two users. When a user sends a message, it first travels to the WhatsApp server where it is stored. Then the server repeatedly requests the receiver to acknowledge receipt of the message. As soon as the message is acknowledged, the server drops the message; it is no longer available in the database of the server. The WhatsApp server keeps the message only for 30 days in its database when it is not delivered (when the receiver is not active on WhatsApp for 30 days).

End-to-end encryption 
On November 18, 2014, Open Whisper Systems announced a partnership with WhatsApp to provide end-to-end encryption by incorporating the encryption protocol used in Signal into each WhatsApp client platform. Open Whisper Systems said that they had already incorporated the protocol into the latest WhatsApp client for Android, and that support for other clients, group/media messages, and key verification would be coming soon after. WhatsApp confirmed the partnership to reporters, but there was no announcement or documentation about the encryption feature on the official website, and further requests for comment were declined. In April 2015, German magazine Heise Security used ARP spoofing to confirm that the protocol had been implemented for Android-to-Android messages, and that WhatsApp messages from or to iPhones running iOS were still not end-to-end encrypted. They expressed the concern that regular WhatsApp users still could not tell the difference between end-to-end encrypted messages and regular messages.

On April 5, 2016, WhatsApp and Open Whisper Systems announced that they had finished adding end-to-end encryption to "every form of communication" on WhatsApp, and that users could now verify each other's keys. Users were also given the option to enable a trust on first use mechanism in order to be notified if a correspondent's key changes. According to a white paper that was released along with the announcement, WhatsApp messages are encrypted with the Signal Protocol. WhatsApp calls are encrypted with SRTP, and all client-server communications are "layered within a separate encrypted channel".

On October 14, 2021, WhatsApp rolled out end-to-end encryption for backups on Android and iOS. The feature has to be turned on by the user and provides the option to encrypt the backup either with a password or a 64-digit encryption key.

The application can store encrypted copies of the chat messages onto the SD card, however chat messages are also stored unencrypted in the SQLite database file "msgstore.db".

WhatsApp Payments 
WhatsApp Payments (marketed as WhatsApp Pay) is a peer-to-peer money transfer feature. WhatsApp has received permission from the National Payments Corporation of India (NPCI) to enter into partnership with multiple banks in July 2017 to allow users to make in-app payments and money transfers using the Unified Payments Interface (UPI). UPI enables account-to-account transfers from a mobile app without having any details of the beneficiary's bank. On November 6, 2020, WhatsApp announced that it had received approval for providing a payment service, although restricted to maximum of 20 million users initially. The service was subsequently rolled out.

In addition to India, the service is available in Brazil and Singapore, with the latter only allowing WhatsApp Business transactions.

WhatsApp cryptocurrency hope, 2019-2022

On February 28, 2019, The New York Times reported that Facebook was “hoping to succeed where Bitcoin failed” by developing an in-house cryptocurrency that would be incorporated into WhatsApp. The project reportedly involves over 50 engineers under the direction of former PayPal president David A. Marcus. This 'Facebook coin' would reportedly be a stablecoin pegged to the value of a basket of different foreign currencies.

In June 2019, Facebook formally announced that the project would be named Libra, and that the company planned for a digital wallet named "Calibra" to be integrated into Facebook and WhatsApp. After financial regulators in the US, Europe, and other regions raised concerns, Calibra was rebranded to Novi in May 2020, and Libra was rebranded to Diem in December 2020. Facebook has stated that Novi would require a government-issued ID for verification and the wallet app would have fraud protection.

Meta ended its Novi project on September 1, 2022.

Controversies and criticism

Misinformation 
WhatsApp has repeatedly imposed limits on message forwarding in response to the spread of misinformation in countries such as India and Australia. The measure, first introduced in 2018 to combat spam, was expanded and remained active in 2021. WhatsApp has stated the forwarding limits have helped to curb the spread of misinformation regarding COVID-19.

Murders in India
In July 2018, WhatsApp encouraged people to report fraudulent or inciting messages after lynch mobs in India murdered innocent people because of malicious WhatsApp messages falsely accusing the victims of intending to abduct children.

2018 elections in Brazil
In an investigation on the use of social media in politics, it was found that WhatsApp was being abused for the spread of fake news in the 2018 presidential elections in Brazil. Furthermore, it has been reported that US$3 million has been spent in illegal off-the-books contributions related to this practice.

Researchers and journalists have called on WhatsApp parent company, Facebook, to adopt measures similar to those adopted in India and restrict the spread of hoaxes and fake news.

Security and privacy 
WhatsApp was initially criticized for its lack of encryption, sending information as plaintext. Encryption was first added in May 2012. End-to-end encryption was only fully implemented in April 2016 after a two-year process. , it is known that WhatsApp makes extensive use of outside contractors and artificial intelligence systems to examine user messages, images and videos; and turns over to law enforcement metadata including critical account and location information.

In 2016, WhatsApp was widely praised for the addition of end-to-end encryption and earned a 6 out of 7 points on the Electronic Frontier Foundation's "Secure Messaging Scorecard". WhatsApp was criticized by security researchers and the Electronic Frontier Foundation for using backups that are not covered by end-to-end encryption and allow messages to be accessed by third-parties.

In May 2019, a security vulnerability in WhatsApp was found and fixed that allowed a remote person to install spyware by making a call which did not need to be answered.

In September 2019, WhatsApp was criticized for its implementation of a 'delete for everyone' feature. iOS users can elect to save media to their camera roll automatically. When a user deletes media for everyone, WhatsApp does not delete images saved in the iOS camera roll and so those users are able to keep the images. WhatsApp released a statement saying that "the feature is working properly," and that images stored in the camera roll cannot be deleted due to Apple's security layers.

In November 2019, WhatsApp released a new privacy feature that let users decide who can add them to groups.

In December 2019, WhatsApp confirmed a security flaw that would allow hackers to use a malicious GIF image file to gain access to the recipient's data. When the recipient opened the gallery within WhatsApp, even if not sending the malicious image, the hack is triggered and the device and its contents become vulnerable. The flaw was patched and users were encouraged to update WhatsApp.

On December 17, 2019, WhatsApp fixed a security flaw that allowed cyber attackers to repeatedly crash the messaging application for all members of group chat, which could only be fixed by forcing the complete uninstall and reinstall of the app. The bug was discovered by Check Point in August 2019 and reported to WhatsApp. It was fixed in version 2.19.246 onwards.

For security purposes, since February 1, 2020, WhatsApp has been made unavailable on smartphones using legacy operating systems like Android 2.3.7 or older and iPhone iOS 8 or older that are no longer updated by their providers.

In April 2020, the NSO Group held its governmental clients accountable for the allegation of human rights abuses by WhatsApp. In its revelation via documents received from court, 
the group claimed that the lawsuit brought against the company by WhatsApp threatened to infringe on its clients’ “national security and foreign policy concerns”. However, the company did not reveal names of the end users, which according to a research by Citizen Lab include, Saudi Arabia, Bahrain, Kazakhstan, Morocco, Mexico and the United Arab Emirates.

On December 16, 2020, a claim that WhatsApp gave Google access to private messages was included in the anti-trust case against the latter. As the complaint is heavily redacted due to being an ongoing case, it doesn't disclose whether this alleged tampering with the app's end-to-end encryption or simply Google accessing user backups.

In January 2021, WhatsApp announced an update to their Privacy Policy which stated that WhatsApp would share user data with Facebook and its "family of companies" beginning February 2021. Previously, users could opt-out of such data sharing, but the new policy removed this option. The new Privacy Policy would not apply within the EU, as it is illegal under the GDPR. Facebook and WhatsApp were widely criticized for this move. The enforcement of the privacy policy was postponed from February 8 to May 15, 2021, WhatsApp announced they have no plans to limit the functionality of the app for those who don't approve the new terms. WhatsApp do not limit the app: they simply insist it cannot be used without acceding.

On October 15, 2021, WhatsApp announced that it would begin offering an end-to-end encryption service for chat backups, meaning no third party (including both WhatsApp and the cloud storage vendor) will have access to a user's information. This new encryption feature adds an additional layer of protection to chat backups stored either on Apple iCloud or Google Drive.

On November 29, 2021, an FBI document was uncovered by Rolling Stone, revealing that WhatsApp responds to warrants and subpoenas from the law enforcement within minutes, providing user metadata to the authorities. The metadata includes things like the user's contact information and their address book.

In January 2022, an unsealed surveillance application revealed that WhatsApp started tracking 7 users from China and Macau in November 2021, based on a request from the DEA investigators. The app collected data on who the users  contacted and how often, as well as when and how they were using the app. This is reportedly not a singular occurrence as federal agencies can use the Electronic Communications Privacy Act to covertly track users without submitting any probable cause or linking a user's number to their identity.

At the beginning of 2022, it was revealed that San Diego-based startup Boldend had developed tools to hack WhatsApp's encryption, gaining access to user data, at some point since the startup's inception in 2017. The vulnerability was reportedly patched in January 2021. Boldend is financed, in part, by Peter Thiel, a notable investor in Facebook.

In September 2022, a critical security issue in WhatsApp Android's video call feature was reported. The integer overflow bug resulted in malicious users being able to take full control of the victim's application once a video call between two WhatsApp users was established. The issue was patched on the day it was officially reported.

National Health Service of the United Kingdom

In 2018, it was reported that around 500,000 National Health Service (NHS) staff used WhatsApp and other instant messaging systems at work and around 29,000 had faced disciplinary action for doing so. Higher usage was reported by frontline clinical staff to keep up with care needs, even though NHS trust policies do not permit their use.

Mods and fake versions

In March 2019, WhatsApp released a guide for users who had installed unofficial modified versions of WhatsApp and warned that it may ban those using unofficial clients.

WhatsApp snooping scandal

In May 2019, WhatsApp was attacked by hackers who installed spyware on a number of victims' smartphones. The hack, allegedly developed by Israeli surveillance technology firm NSO Group, injected malware onto WhatsApp users’ phones via a remote-exploit bug in the app's Voice over IP calling functions. A Wired report noted the attack was able to inject malware via calls to the targeted phone, even if the user did not answer the call.

On October 29, WhatsApp filed a lawsuit against NSO Group in a San Francisco court, claiming that the alleged cyberattack violated US laws including the Computer Fraud and Abuse Act (CFAA). According to WhatsApp, the exploit "targeted at least 100 human-rights defenders, journalists and other members of civil society" among a total of 1,400 users in 20 countries. On July 16, 2020, a US federal judge ruled that the lawsuit against NSO group could proceed. NSO Group filed a motion to have the lawsuit dismissed, but the judge denied all of its arguments.

In April 2020, the NSO Group held its governmental clients accountable for the allegation of human rights abuses by WhatsApp. In its revelation via documents received via court, the group claimed that the lawsuit brought against the company by WhatsApp threatened to infringe on its clients’ “national security and foreign policy concerns”. However, the company did not reveal the names of the end users, which according to research by Citizen Lab include, Saudi Arabia, Bahrain, Kazakhstan, Morocco, Mexico and the United Arab Emirates.

Jeff Bezos phone hack

In January 2020, a digital forensic analysis revealed that the Amazon founder Jeff Bezos received an encrypted message on WhatsApp from the official account of Saudi Arabia’s Crown Prince Mohammed bin Salman. The message reportedly contained a malicious file, the receipt of which resulted in Bezos’ phone being hacked. The United Nations’ special rapporteur David Kaye and Agnes Callamard later confirmed that Jeff Bezos’ phone was hacked through WhatsApp, as he was one of the targets of Saudi's hit list of individuals close to The Washington Post journalist Jamal Khashoggi.

FBI

In 2021, an FBI document obtained by Property of the People, Inc., a 501(c)(3) nonprofit organization, through an FOIA request, reveals, that WhatsApp and iMessage are vulnerable to law-enforcement real-time searches.

Tek Fog

In January 2022, an investigation by The Wire found that BJP, an Indian political party allegedly used an app called Tek Fog which was capable of hacking inactive WhatsApp accounts en masse in order to mass message their contacts with propaganda. According to the Wire, a whistleblower with app access was able to hack a test WhatsApp account controlled by reporters "within minutes."

Terrorism 
In December 2015, it was reported that a terrorists organization ISIS had been using WhatsApp to plot the November 2015 Paris attacks. According to The Independent, ISIS also uses WhatsApp to traffic sex slaves.

In March 2017, British Home Secretary Amber Rudd said encryption capabilities of messaging tools like WhatsApp are unacceptable, as news reported that Khalid Masood used the application several minutes before perpetrating the 2017 Westminster attack. Rudd publicly called for police and intelligence agencies to be given access to WhatsApp and other encrypted messaging services to prevent future terror attacks.

In April 2017, the perpetrator of the Stockholm truck attack reportedly used WhatsApp to exchange messages with an ISIS supporter shortly before and after the incident. The messages involved discussing how to make an explosive device and a confession to the attack.

In April 2017, nearly 300 WhatsApp groups with about 250 members each were reportedly being used to mobilize stone-pelters in Jammu and Kashmir to disrupt security forces' operations at encounter sites. According to police, 90% of these groups were closed down after counselling of admins of these groups. Further, after a six-month probe which involved the infiltration of 79 WhatsApp groups, the National Investigation Agency reported that out of about 6386 members and admins of these groups, about 1000 were residents of Pakistan and gulf nations. Further, for their help in negating anti-terror operations, the Indian stone pelters were getting funded through barter trade from Pakistan and other indirect means.

In May 2022, the FBI stated that an ISIS sympathizer, who was plotting to assassinate George W. Bush, was arrested based on his WhatsApp data. According to the arrest warrant for the suspect, his WhatsApp account was placed under surveillance.

Scams and malware 
There are numerous ongoing scams on WhatsApp that let hackers spread viruses or malware. In May 2016, some WhatsApp users were reported to have been tricked into downloading a third-party application called WhatsApp Gold, which was part of a scam that infected the users' phones with malware. A message that promises to allow access to their WhatsApp friends' conversations, or their contact lists, has become the most popular hit against anyone who uses the application in Brazil. Clicking on the message actually sends paid text messages. Since December 2016, more than 1.5 million people have clicked and lost money.

Another application called GB WhatsApp is considered malicious by cybersecurity firm Symantec because it usually performs some unauthorized operations on end-user devices.

Bans

China 
WhatsApp is owned by Meta, whose main social media service has been blocked in China since 2009. In September 2017, security researchers reported to The New York Times that the WhatsApp service had been completely blocked in China.

Iran 
On May 9, 2014, the government of Iran announced that it had proposed to block the access to WhatsApp service to Iranian residents. "The reason for this is the assumption of WhatsApp by the Facebook founder Mark Zuckerberg, who is an American Zionist," said Abdolsamad Khorramabadi, head of the country's Committee on Internet Crimes. Subsequently, Iranian president Hassan Rouhani issued an order to the Ministry of ICT to stop filtering WhatsApp. It was blocked permanently until Meta answers September 2022.

Turkey 
Turkey temporarily banned WhatsApp in 2016, following the assassination of the Russian ambassador to Turkey.

Brazil 
On March 1, 2016, Diego Dzodan, Facebook's vice-president for Latin America was arrested in Brazil for not cooperating with an investigation in which WhatsApp conversations were requested. On March 2, 2016, at dawn the next day, Dzodan was released because the Court of Appeal held that the arrest was disproportionate and unreasonable.

On May 2, 2016, mobile providers in Brazil were ordered to block WhatsApp for 72 hours for the service's second failure to cooperate with criminal court orders. Once again, the block was lifted following an appeal, after less than 24 hours.

Brazil's Central Bank issued an order to Visa and Mastercard on June 23, 2020, to stop working with WhatsApp on its new electronic payment system. A statement from the Bank asserted the decision to block the Facebook-owned company's latest offering was taken in order to “preserve an adequate competitive environment” in the mobile payments space and to ensure “functioning of a payment system that's interchangeable, fast, secure, transparent, open and cheap.”

Uganda 
The government of Uganda banned WhatsApp and Facebook, along with other social media platforms, to enforce a tax on the use of social media. Users are to be charged USh.200/= per day to access these services according to the new law set by parliament.

United Arab Emirates (UAE) 
The United Arab Emirates banned WhatsApp video chat and VoIP call applications in as early as 2013 due to what is often reported as an effort to protect the commercial interests of their home grown nationally owned telecom providers (du and Etisalat). Their app ToTok has received press suggesting it is able to spy on users.

Cuba
In July 2021, the Cuban government blocked access to several social media platforms, including WhatsApp, to curb the spread of information during the anti-government protests.

Switzerland
In December 2021, the Swiss army banned the use of WhatsApp and several other non-Swiss encrypted messaging services by army personnel. The ban was prompted by concerns of US authorities potentially accessing user data for such apps because of the CLOUD Act. The army recommended that all army personnel use Threema instead, as the service is based in Switzerland.

Zambia
In August 2021, the digital rights organization Access Now reported that WhatsApp along with several other social media apps was being blocked in Zambia for the duration of the general election. The organization reported a massive drop-off in traffic for the blocked services, though the country's government made no official statements about the block.

Third-party clients 
In mid-2013, WhatsApp Inc. filed for the DMCA takedown of the discussion thread on the XDA Developers forums about the then popular third-party client "WhatsApp Plus".

In 2015, some third-party WhatsApp clients that were reverse-engineering the WhatsApp mobile app, received a cease and desist to stop activities that were violating WhatsApp legal terms. As a result, users of third-party WhatsApp clients were also banned.

WhatsApp Business 
In September 2017, WhatsApp confirmed rumors that they were building and testing two new tools for businesses.
The apps were launched in January 2018, separated by the intended userbase:
 A WhatsApp Business app for small companies
 An Enterprise Solution for bigger companies with global customer bases, such as airlines, e-commerce retailers and banks, who would be able to offer customer service and conversational commerce (e-commerce) via WhatsApp chat, using live agents or chatbots (as far back as 2015, companies like Meteordesk had provided unofficial solutions for enterprises to attend to large numbers of users, but these were shut down by WhatsApp)

In October 2020, Facebook announced the introduction of pricing tiers for services offered via the WhatsApp Business API, charged on a per-message basis.

User statistics 
WhatsApp handled ten billion messages per day in August 2012, growing from two billion in April 2012, and one billion the previous October. On June 13, 2013, WhatsApp announced that they had reached their new daily record by processing 27 billion messages. According to the Financial Times, WhatsApp "has done to SMS on mobile phones what Skype did to international calling on landlines".

By April 22, 2014, WhatsApp had over 500 million monthly active users, 700 million photos and 100 million videos were being shared daily, and the messaging system was handling more than 10 billion messages each day.

On August 24, 2014, Koum announced on his Twitter account that WhatsApp had over 600 million active users worldwide. At that point WhatsApp was adding about 25 million new users every month, or 833,000 active users per day.

In May 2017, it was reported that WhatsApp users spend over 340 million minutes on video calls each day on the app. This is the equivalent of roughly 646 years of video calls per day.

By February 2017, WhatsApp had over 1.2 billion users globally, reaching 1.5 billion monthly active users by the end of 2017.

In January 2020, WhatsApp registers over 5 billion installs on Google Play Store making it only the second non-Google app to achieve this milestone.

As of February 2020,  WhatsApp had over 2 billion users globally.

Specific markets 

India is by far WhatsApp's largest market in terms of total number of users. In May 2014, WhatsApp crossed 50 million monthly active users in India, which is also its largest country by the number of monthly active users, then 70 million in October 2014, making users in India 10% of WhatsApp's total user base. In February 2017, WhatsApp reached 200 million monthly active users in India.

Israel is one of WhatsApp's strongest markets in terms of ubiquitous usage. According to Globes, already by 2013 the application was installed on 92% of all smartphones, with 86% of users reporting daily use. WhatsApp's group chat feature is reportedly used by many Israeli families to stay in contact with each other.

Competition 
WhatsApp competes with a number of messaging services. They include services like iMessage (estimated 1.3 billion active users), WeChat (1.2 billion active users), Telegram (500 million users), Viber (260 million active users), LINE (217 million active users), and Signal (over 50 million active users). Both Telegram and Signal in particular were reported to get registration spikes during WhatsApp outages and controversies.

WhatsApp has increasingly drawn its innovation from competing services, such as a Telegram-inspired web version and features for groups. In 2016, WhatsApp was accused of copying features from a then-unreleased version of iMessage.

See also 
 Comparison of instant messaging clients
 Comparison of user features of messaging platforms
 Comparison of VoIP software
 Criticism of Facebook
 Instagram
 List of most-downloaded Google Play applications

References

External links 
 
 

 
Social media
Meta Platforms acquisitions
Meta Platforms applications
2014 mergers and acquisitions
Android Auto software
VoIP software
Mobile applications
Android (operating system) software
BlackBerry software
IOS software
Symbian software
Instant messaging clients
Cross-platform software
Communication software
Companies based in Mountain View, California
Software companies based in the San Francisco Bay Area
2009 software
Software companies of the United States